The U.S. Department of Defense (DoD) employs Unmanned Aerial Systems (UAS) across all echelons to support tactical, operational, and strategic operations. The types of UAS that are used in these operations are categorized into "Groups" according to their size and capability. Previous to 2010, UAS were categorized into "Tiers" or "Classes" separately by each branch of the military. In order to promote a homogeneous categorization, the "group system" was developed.

DoD UAS Groups 
The "Group" system has 5 categories, from 1 to 5, with each category increasing in capability.

Tier System (Deprecated) 
The previous (used circa 2004 - 2011) classification system, termed the "Tier System", was used by military planners to designate the various individual aircraft elements in an overall usage plan for integrated operations. The Tiers do not refer to specific models of aircraft, but rather roles the aircraft would fill. The U.S. Air Force, U.S. Marine Corps, and U.S. Army each have their own tier system, and the systems are themselves not integrated.

US Air Force tiers 
 Tier N/A: Small/Micro UAV. Role filled by BATMAV (Wasp Block III).
 Tier I: Low altitude, long endurance. Role filled by the Gnat 750.
 Tier II: Medium altitude, long endurance (MALE). Role currently filled by the Predator and MQ-9 Reaper.
 Tier II+: High altitude, long endurance conventional UAV (or HALE UAV). Complementary to the Tier III- aircraft. Role currently filled by the RQ-4 Global Hawk.
 Tier III-: High altitude, long endurance low-observable UAV. Same parameters as, and complementary to, the Tier II+ aircraft. The RQ-3 DarkStar was originally intended to fulfill this role before it was "terminated". Role now filled by RQ-170 Sentinel.

US Marine Corps tiers 
 Tier N/A: Micro UAV. Wasp III fills this role, driven largely by the desire for commonality with the USAF BATMAV.
 Tier I: Role currently filled by the Dragon Eye but all ongoing and future procurement for the Dragon Eye program is going now to the RQ-11B Raven B.
 Tier II: Role currently filled by the Scan Eagle and the AAI RQ-7 Shadow.
 Tier III: For two decades, the role of medium range tactical UAV was filled by the Pioneer UAV. In July 2007, the Marine Corps announced its intention to retire the aging Pioneer fleet and transition to the RQ-7 Shadow tactical unmanned aircraft system by AAI Corporation. The first Marine Shadow systems have already been delivered, and training for their respective Marine Corps units is underway.
Role currently filled by the AAI RQ-7 Shadow, although USMC planners do not view this aircraft as meeting future Tier III requirements.

US Army tiers 
 Tier I: Small UAV. Role filled by the RQ-11A/B Raven.
 Tier II: Short Range Tactical UAV. Role filled by the RQ-7A/B Shadow 200.
 Tier III: Medium Range Tactical UAV. Role formerly filled by the MQ-5A/B Hunter and IGNAT/IGNAT-ER, but has transitioned to the Extended Range Multi-Purpose (ERMP) MQ-1C Gray Eagle.

Future Combat Systems (Cancelled) 

Future Combat Systems (FCS) was the United States Army's principal modernization program from 2003 to early 2009.
 Class I: For small units. Role to be filled by all new UAV with some similarity to Micro Air Vehicle.
 Class II: For companies (cancelled).
 Class III: For battalions (cancelled).
 Class IV: For brigades. Role to be filled by the RQ-8A/B / MQ-8B Fire Scout.

References 

United States Department of Defense
Unmanned military aircraft of the United States